Apometriocnemus is a genus of non-biting midges in the subfamily Chironominae of the bloodworm family Chironomidae.

Species
A. fontinalis Sæther, 1984
A. japonicus Kobayashi & Suzuki, 1999

A. beringensis Cranston & Oliver, 1988 was transferred to Metriocnemus by Sæther in 1995.

References

Chironomoidea genera